The Etches Collection (also known as the Museum of Jurassic Marine Life) is an independent fossil museum located in the village of Kimmeridge, Purbeck, Dorset, England. It is based on the lifetime collection of Steve Etches, a fossil hunter for whom some of his finds have been named, from the local area on the Jurassic Coast, an SSI and World Heritage Site, especially around Kimmeridge Bay and the Kimmeridge Ledges.

Building
The museum building was opened in 2016 at a cost of £5 million to house a collection of over 2,000 fossil specimens so that they would remain accessible beyond the lifetime of Steve Etches.

Collection
Steve Etches had been collecting for over 30 years prior to the museum opening, and in this time he has amassed a collection of fossils of international scientific importance that form the basis of the collection.  The collection includes examples of ammonite eggs and fossils from the Upper Jurassic Kimmeridge Clay Formation including Thalassodraco etchesi gen. et sp. nov..

See also
 List of museums in Dorset

References

External links

 The Etches Collection website

2016 establishments in England
Museums established in 2016
Biographical museums in Dorset
Geology museums in England
Fossil museums
Collections of museums in the United Kingdom
Isle of Purbeck
Jurassic Coast